Nathan Nicholas Trupp (born 1947) is an American serial killer. He murdered at least five victims in New Mexico.

References 

1947 births
20th-century American criminals
American emigrants to Israel
American Jews
American male criminals
American people convicted of murder
American serial killers
Living people
Male serial killers
People acquitted by reason of insanity
People acquitted of murder
People convicted of murder by New Mexico
Place of birth missing (living people)